Robert McKillop (born July 13, 1950) is an American college basketball coach who is the former head coach of the Davidson Wildcats men's team of the Atlantic 10 Conference.

Early basketball career
Born in Queens, New York, McKillop grew up in Queens and on Long Island and played for Chaminade High School in Mineola. McKillop went on to play college ball for East Carolina University before transferring to Hofstra University.  At Hofstra he was named team MVP. After graduating in 1972 with a degree in history, he was briefly signed as a free agent by the Philadelphia 76ers, but was cut.

Coaching career
He then accepted a job teaching history and coaching basketball back on Long Island at Holy Trinity Diocesan High School in Hicksville. There, McKillop achieved an 86–25 record. In 1978 he became an assistant coach at Davidson for one year before returning to high school ball at Long Island Lutheran Middle and High School in Brookville. There, McKillop compiled a record of 182–51, winning five New York State Championships.

Head coach at Davidson
In 1989, McKillop returned to Davidson as head coach.  He is Davidson's all-time leader in wins, years coached, and games coached.  His 230 Southern Conference wins are more than any coach in league history. He has been the SoCon Coach of the Year seven times, has won thirteen conference division titles, seven tournament championships, and taken his team to seven NCAA tournaments and four postseason NITs. All this winning hasn't come at any academic sacrifice, as 95 per cent of his Davidson lettermen have graduated.  In 2006 the Wildcats won the Southern Conference tournament and went on to face No. 4 seeded Ohio State in the NCAA tournament.  13th seeded Davidson led 29–25 at halftime before falling 70–62.  On January 27, 2007, McKillop reached 300 wins with a 79–59 victory over Western Carolina in Belk Arena.  On February 26, 2011 he reached 400 wins with a 78–67 victory over UNC Greensboro.

Despite the recent success of the Wildcats, the 2006–07 season promised to be a rebuilding year, as McKillop lost seven seniors, accounting for 76% of scoring. Nevertheless, Davidson finished the year with an overall record of 24–4 and 17–1 in the SoCon. They were ranked 31st in the nation by the ESPN/USA Today poll and #4 among mid-majors.  In the months of December, January and February, the Wildcats lost a total of one game. This season saw the arrival of the Wildcats' greatest modern player, future two-time NBA MVP Stephen Curry.

On March 3, 2007, the Wildcats won their second straight Southern Conference tournament Championship, and third in 5 years.  Davidson defeated College of Charleston 72–65, after waltzing past Furman and UT Chattanooga in the earlier rounds.  In 2007, McKillop's Wildcats represented the Southern Conference in the NCAA tournament by battling number 4 seed Maryland losing by 12 at Buffalo.

In 2008, after compiling a perfect regular season conference record, the Wildcats ran their record to three straight Southern Conference tournament Championships, beating Elon in the title game. They entered the NCAA tournament as a 10-seed and took down 7-seed Gonzaga, for their first NCAA Tournament win since 1969. They then won their second-round game against the 2-seed Georgetown to advance to the Sweet 16. Almost a week after beating Georgetown, McKillop and Davidson stunned the world by upsetting the 3 seed and regular season Big Ten champions Wisconsin.  This win put Davidson in the Elite Eight for the first time since Lefty Driesell got them there in 1969.

The 2008 season was a testament to McKillop's recruiting prowess, as they were carried by the shooting of Curry, who did not get a second look from most of the bigger programs.

In February 2014, Davidson named the playing surface at Davidson's on-campus arena, John M. Belk Arena, "McKillop Court"—much to McKillop's surprise.

Family
McKillop and his wife, Cathy, have three children, all of whom graduated from Davidson—Kerrin in 2003, Matt in 2006, and Brendan in 2011. Matt played for his father from 2003 to 2006 and earned four varsity letters. After assisting former Wildcat player and assistant coach Jason Zimmerman at Emory University in Atlanta, Matt was named assistant coach to his father at Davidson in 2008, was elevated to associate head coach in 2016, and succeeded his father as Wildcats head coach in 2022. Brendan also played for his father at Davidson.

All of McKillop's children married Davidson students; Kerrin married Henry Heil, Matt married former Wildcats tennis player Kelsey Linville, and Brenden married Keena Classen. McKillop has five grandchildren: Kerrin's children Maggie, Claire, and Jack Heil; and Matt's daughters Hazel and Rosie McKillop.

Head coaching record

College

References

External links
 Davidson profile

1950 births
Living people
American men's basketball coaches
American men's basketball players
Basketball coaches from New York (state)
Basketball players from New York City
Chaminade High School alumni
College men's basketball head coaches in the United States
Davidson Wildcats men's basketball coaches
East Carolina Pirates men's basketball players
High school basketball coaches in the United States
Hofstra Pride men's basketball players
Sportspeople from Queens, New York